JCSAT-15 is a communications satellite designed and manufactured for SKY Perfect JSAT Group by SSL on the SSL 1300 platform. Its payload is composed of Ku band and Ka band transponders.

SKY Perfect JSAT Group will use JCSAT-15 as a replacement of N-SAT-110.

History
In April 2014, SSL announced that it had been awarded a contract by SKY Perfect JSAT Group to manufacture two satellites: JCSAT-15 and JCSAT-16. The former would be a 10 kW satellite to be a replacement of N-SAT-110 plus expansion capability.

On Sep 8, 2014 Arianespace announced that it had signed a launch service contract with JSAT for the launch of JCSAT-15 aboard an Ariane 5 ECA rocket, and the launch occurred on December 21, 2016. It will move to a geostationary orbit at 110E.

References

Satellites using the SSL 1300 bus
Spacecraft launched in 2016
Communications satellites of Japan
Satellites of Japan
2016 in Japan